Jules de Polignac, 1st Duke of Polignac (Armand Jules François; 7 June 1746 – 21 September 1817) was a French nobleman and the husband of Yolande de Polastron, a confidante of Queen Marie Antoinette. He became the first Duke of Polignac in 1780. He died at the age of seventy one in Little Russia, where he was given a manor by Catherine the Great.

Life and marriage

He was born at Claye-Souilly to Louis Héracle Armand de Polignac, Marquis of Mancini, and his wife, Diane Adélaide Zéphirine Mancini, herself a granddaughter of the Duke of Nevers and the Duke of Noailles. He bore the title of Marquis of Mancini. He was the couple's fourth child of five, and their second son, and the brother of Diane de Polignac.

On 7 July 1767, he married Yolande Martine Gabrielle de Polastron. His wife was later the favourite of Marie Antoinette. As a result, he was created Duke of Polignac on 20 September 1780. At the revolution, he fled France and died in Ukraine at the age of 71.

Issue
Aglaé Louise Françoise Gabrielle de Polignac (7 May 1768 – 30 March 1803); married the Duke of Guiche and was nicknamed Guichette;
Armand Jules Marie Héracle de Polignac, 2nd Duke of Polignac (11 January 1771 – 1 March 1847); married Ida Johanna Lina van Neukirchen gen. Nijvenheim, with no issue;
Auguste Jules Armand Marie de Polignac, Prince of Polignac and later 3rd Duke of Polignac (10 November 1780 – 30 March 1847); married firstly Barbara Campbell (1788–1819) and had issue; secondly Mary Charlotte Parkyns (1792–1864) and had issue; was French Prime Minister from 1829 to 1830, under the government of Charles X of France;
Camille Henri Melchior de Polignac, Count of Polignac (27 December 1781 – 2 February 1855); married Marie Charlotte Calixte Alphonsine Le Vassor de la Touche (1791–1861) and had issue; they were the patrilineal ancestors of Pierre de Polignac, who married Princess Charlotte, Duchess of Valentinois, and was the father of Rainier III, Prince of Monaco, and grandfather of the current reigning Prince, Albert II.

Ancestry

External links
 

1746 births
1817 deaths
People from Claye-Souilly
Jules
Ancien Régime office-holders
Jules